Owyhee Reservoir or Owyhee Lake is a reservoir on the Owyhee River in Malheur County, Oregon, United States. The  lake is home to several species of fish, including crappie, rainbow trout, largemouth bass, smallmouth bass, yellow perch, and brown bullhead. An artificial lake, it was created in 1932 with the completion of the Owyhee Dam. The lake supplies water for irrigation for 1,800 farms covering 118,000 acres of land in Eastern Oregon and Southwestern Idaho. Seasonal Lake Owyhee State Park is located on the northeast shore and includes a boat ramp.

See also
 Owyhee Reservoir State Airport
 List of lakes in Oregon

References

External links
 
 Owyhee Dam: U.S. Bureau of Reclamation
 Oregon Department of Fish and Wildlife
 US Bureau of Reclamation reservoir levels and flows

Reservoirs in Oregon
Owyhee River
Owyhee Desert
Bureau of Land Management areas in Oregon
Lakes of Malheur County, Oregon
Tourist attractions in Malheur County, Oregon
Buildings and structures in Malheur County, Oregon
Protected areas of Malheur County, Oregon
1932 establishments in Oregon